This is a list of the Members of Parliament appointed as Steward of the Manor of East Hendred, a notional 'office of profit under the crown' which was used to resign from the House of Commons. Appointment of an MP to the office was first made in 1763. The Manor of East Hendred was sold by the Crown in 1823, but through oversight, appointments to the post of Steward continued until 1840, after which it was discontinued for Parliamentary purposes in favour of other stewardships. The last steward died in 1851.

Stewards 
Dates given are of the writ to replace the member who accepted the stewardship.

See also 
 List of Stewards of the Chiltern Hundreds
 List of Stewards of the Manor of Hempholme
 List of Stewards of the Manor of Northstead
 List of Stewards of the Manor of Old Shoreham
 List of Stewards of the Manor of Poynings

References

East Hendred